The Center for Nanoscale Materials is one of five Nanoscale Science Research Centers the United States Department of Energy sponsors. The Center is at Argonne National Laboratory location in Lemont, Illinois.

The Center for Nanoscale Materials at Argonne National Laboratory is part of the U.S. Department of Energy (DOE) Office of Basic Energy Science Nanoscale Science Research Center program. The CNM serves as a user-based center, providing tools and infrastructure for nanoscience and nanotechnology research. The CNM's mission includes supporting basic research and the development of advanced instrumentation that helps generate new scientific insights and create new materials with novel properties. With its centralized facilities, controlled environments, technical support, and scientific staff, the CNM enables researchers to excel and significantly extend their reach.

CNM researchers work at the leading edge of science and technology to develop capabilities and knowledge that complement those of industry. The challenges the CNM faces involve fabricating and exploring novel nanoscale materials and employing unique synthesis and characterization methods to control and tailor nanoscale phenomena. The unique capabilities of Argonne's Advanced Photon Source (APS) play a key role. APS's hard X-rays, harnessed in a nanoprobe beamline, provide unprecedented capabilities to characterize extremely small structures.

Argonne's long-standing culture of outreach to, and inclusion of, the academic and industrial communities help support regional and national goals and strategic interests. The CNM welcomes outside users, both as independent investigators and as collaborators, from a wide range of scientific fields. This accessibility ensures a cross-disciplinary approach to nano-related research that helps ideas and activities to cross-pollinate, mature, and evolve over time into the pathways of scientific investigation and discovery that will help shape the future of our society.

See also
X-ray nanoprobe

References

External links
 Argonne Center for Nanoscale Materials
 CNM's Flickr site

Nanoscale Science Research Centers
Argonne National Laboratory
Leadership in Energy and Environmental Design basic silver certified buildings